Purwosari Station (PWS) is a large class type C railway station located in Purwosari, Laweyan, Surakarta. The station which is located at an altitude of +98 m is included in the Operational Area VI Yogyakarta and only serves economy class trains across south and local or commuter.

This station is a railroad branch station between the directions Surabaya and Wonogiri. The route to Surabaya is the main route, while the one to Wonogiri is a cross-branch route. As far as Sangkrah Station, this secondary route is unique because it is one of the active railways in Indonesia that is lined up or side by side with the main road, in addition to branching to the Pertamina Madiun Depot. In the past, along the Purwosari–Sangkrah route, there were eight small stops, namely Pesanggrahan, Ngadisuran, Bando, Ngapeman, Pasarpon, Cayudan, Kauman, and Lojiwetan. The bus stops are no longer there.

History
Purwosari Station is the second oldest train station in Surakarta. In the map of the Samarang – Vorstenlanden line published in 1869, the collection of the Dutch Universiteit Leiden, this station is not mentioned at all. The Nederlandsch-Indische Spoorweg Maatschappij (NIS) plan to build a railway line (NIS) is Solo Station (Solo Balapan Station) and Solo-Rivier Station, which are located in the Bengawan Solo valley. However, on maps drawn in 1878, the station's name began to be called (but under the wrong name, Poerwodadie). It is estimated that the addition of this station will be carried out together with the finishing of the railway line and also opened together with the official opening of the Ceper – Solo NIS segment line on 27 March 1871.

Since 1907, this station has used an architecture similar to that of Kedungjati and Willem I Ambarawa Stations. The station which was originally a side platform later became an island station. The size of this station building is smaller than Kedungjati or Purwosari because the roof span is only 13 meters, while Kedungjati is 14.65 meters and Ambarawa is 21.75 meters. This building consists of a canopy that covers the main building and a path that flanks it.

Building and layout
Initially Purwosari Station had eight train lines with line 2 being a straight line. After the double track crossing Solo - Yogyakarta was operated in 2007, line 2 was used as a straight line towards Solo Balapan and line 3 was used as a straight line towards Yogyakarta. Line 1-5 is often used to welcome arrivals as well as to cross directly the train, line 6-8 to park freight cars, and two additional lines to the locomotive depot and cement warehouse. Although this station has undergone renovations in the form of an overcapping roof since the Eid homecoming season in October 2010, the original station building has been preserved and made a cultural heritage.

This station used to be unique because in the middle of the rail yard that had been given overcapping there was a wesel and an intersection that was connected to line 3 to line 4. The intersection crossed the platforms on the two lines. However, since the station's signaling system was replaced with an electric signaling system made by PT Len Industri Indonesia (Persero) in December 2015, line 4, wesel, as well as the intersection was dismantled to widen the platform so that the station only has seven lines.

To the east from line 1 there is a fork towards Wonogiri. From this station there is also a fork that goes to Boyolali through Kartasura which has now been deactivated. This line also has branches in Tegalsari towards Colomadu. Until now some parts of the remnants of this route can still be seen.

Formerly Purwosari Station had a locomotive depot; There is still a water tower on the north side of the station as a legacy as a locomotive depot. Currently, the depot is still operating, but it is not a locomotive depot, but a mechanical dispenser. The loading and unloading of cement is also carried out at this station.

This station was last renovated in 2017, by replacing the floor of the station, which was originally known as the NIS tile, with marble floors. This tile, produced by Alfred Regout & Co., Maastricht, Netherlands, has a size of 20 × 20 cm with an uneven texture to facilitate airflow. This tile is strong, sturdy, and durable considering the original function of this station as a goods station.

Services
The following is a list of train services at the Purwosari Station.

Passenger services
 Mixed class
 Singasari, to  via -- and to  via  (executive-economy plus)
 Gaya Baru Malam Selatan, to  via -- and to  via - (executive-economy plus)
 Plus economy class
 Jaka Tingkir, from and to  via --
 Economy class
 Kahuripan, to  via - and to  via 
 Pasundan, to  via - and to  via 
 Bengawan, from and to  via --
 Economy commuter
 Bathara Kresna, from and to 
 Airport Rail Link
 Tourist train
 Sepur Kluthuk Jaladara, to

Freight services
 Over Night Services Parcel, destination to:
  via - and to  via -
  via - and to  via -

Intermodal connection 
A Batik Solo Trans bus station is located nearby, serving Corridor 2 of the service.

References

External links
 

Buildings and structures in Surakarta
Railway stations in Central Java